Pollenia mesopotamica is a species of cluster fly in the family Polleniidae.

Distribution
Iraq.

References

Polleniidae
Insects described in 2009
Diptera of Asia